This is a comparison of dancing video game series in which players must step on panels on a dance pad in time with music. Step placement and timing is indicated by rising arrows overlapping fixed targets.

General information

3 or more simultaneous presses
Some games have 3 or more simultaneous presses. This is supposed to be accomplished via pressing two arrows with the feet and the extra arrows with the player's hands, hence the name "hands". Using carefully positioned feet to hit multiple arrows at once (also known as bracketing) is also another method and is the most common method for much harder songs as time goes by.

Dance Dance Revolution: No hands officially. A single song in Dancing Stage 1.5 (Uh La La La Maniac Single) features one hand due to an oversight, a single song in Ultramix 2 (Skulk Challenge Single) features at least one hand but the chart is unused and inaccessible without hacking the game, and four songs in Solo 2000 feature at least one hand. Hands are also disallowed in Edit Mode, though a glitch can circumvent this.
Dance Praise: No hands officially, although some songs feature glitches that require three or four panels to be pressed simultaneously.
In The Groove: Having 3 or 4 arrows at once is common. Bend Your Mind Double Expert is the only song to use six panels that must be pressed at once, requiring using knees as well. It is worth noting that on machines which were converted from DDR to ITG, it is usually more difficult to hit hands because one must apply much more pressure to get steps to register; this is because DDR cabinets were not originally designed with hand play in mind.
Pump It Up: Yes. In Five-Panel (Singles) songs above the level 13, to press three arrows at once (Triples) is fairly common, albeit often done with the heel rather than a hand. In Ten-Panel songs (Doubles) above the level 17, to press four arrows at once (Quads) is not uncommon, but once again, hands are often not involved. In some boss songs, you might have to press five (singles) or six (doubles) arrows at once, in which case you do have to use the hands, but more than this (eight or ten) has been mostly discontinued (except for some boss missions and gimmick "another" charts)
StepManiaX: Various songs have multiple 3 or more arrows as well, usually in the form of involving the center panel where it is central to the other panels. Some songs do contain 3 or more panels that don't use the center panel.

Notes

References

 
Video game lists
Computing comparisons